The canton of Les Monts d'Aunay (before 2021: Aunay-sur-Odon) is an administrative division of the Calvados department, northwestern France. Its borders were modified at the French canton reorganisation which came into effect in March 2015. Its seat is in Les Monts d'Aunay.

Composition

It consists of the following communes:

Amayé-sur-Seulles
Aurseulles
Bonnemaison
Brémoy
Cahagnes
Caumont-sur-Aure
Courvaudon
Dialan sur Chaîne
Épinay-sur-Odon
Hottot-les-Bagues
Landes-sur-Ajon
Lingèvres
Les Loges
Longvillers
Maisoncelles-Pelvey
Maisoncelles-sur-Ajon
Malherbe-sur-Ajon
Le Mesnil-au-Grain
Les Monts d'Aunay (partly)
Monts-en-Bessin
Parfouru-sur-Odon
Saint-Louet-sur-Seulles
Saint-Pierre-du-Fresne
Seulline
Tracy-Bocage
Val d'Arry
Val de Drôme
Villers-Bocage
Villy-Bocage

Councillors

Pictures of the canton

References

Cantons of Calvados (department)